Allonby v Accrington & Rossendale College (2004) C-256/01 is a European Union law case concerning the right of men and women to equal pay for work of equal value under Article 141 of the Treaty of the European Community.

Background
Part-time lecturers at Accrington and Rossendale College did not have their contracts renewed. They were rehired through an agency, ELS, and said to be "self-employed independent contractors" under the new arrangement. They were denied access to the Teachers Superannuation Scheme. It was apparent that more of the part-time lecturers were women than the staff that remained under permanent contracts with the college.

They brought a claim for unfair dismissal and sex discrimination. The Tribunal held that while there was no sex discrimination, there was an unfair dismissal. Lindsay J in the Employment Appeal Tribunal held there were sound business reasons for the change, given that the college was in financial trouble, and therefore objective justification of the disparate impact on women and no discrimination.

Judgment

Court of Appeal
The Court of Appeal referred to the European Court of Justice for advice on the application of Art. 141. It held that the EAT failed to consider whether there could ever be a justification if the primary aim of the dismissal was discriminatory. Sedley LJ commented as follows, without saying whether the outcome would be favourable when it was reconsidered at tribunal, which would have to decide again on proportionate impact.

European Court of Justice
The ECJ held that despite the contract saying they were self-employed, and despite national legislation under the Equal Pay Act 1970 applying only to employees, workers and those personally performing work (which may have brought the outside the Act's protection) the lecturers did fall within the Community definition of worker.

However, while they fell within the category of "worker", their claim failed because she could not point to a comparator that came from the same "single source".

Yet the ECJ stated that the rule that only "employees" could join the Teachers' Superannuation Scheme could well be incompatible with Article 141. The rule would be incompatible and should be disapplied if it shown to have an adverse impact on more women than men. If it is disapplied, it is not necessary for the claimant to point to a comparator of the opposite sex working for the same employer who has been adversely affected by the rule.

See also
UK employment equality law
United Kingdom employment equality law
Gender equality
List of gender equality lawsuits

Notes

References
E McGaughey, A Casebook on Labour Law (Hart 2019) ch 13, 607

External links
 Judgment of the Court of 17 September 2002. A. G. Lawrence and Others v Regent Office Care Ltd, Commercial Catering Group and Mitie Secure Services Ltd. Reference for a preliminary ruling: Court of Appeal (England & Wales) (Civil Division) – United Kingdom. Principle of equal pay for men and women – Direct effect – Comparison of the work performed for different employers. Case C-320/00.

Court of Justice of the European Union case law
United Kingdom labour case law
2004 in case law
2004 in England
Accrington
Anti-discrimination law in the United Kingdom
Sexism
Gender equality case law
2004 in British law
European Union labour case law
Gender discrimination lawsuits